Wila Wilani (Aymara wila blood, blood-red, the reduplication indicates that there is a group or a complex of something, "the one with a complex of red color") is a  mountain in the Andes of Bolivia. It is situated in the La Paz Department, Larecaja Province, Sorata Municipality, north of the Cordillera Real. Wila Wilani lies at the river Ch'uch'u Jawira.

See also 
 Llawi Imaña

References 

Mountains of La Paz Department (Bolivia)